Ante Mašić (born October 18, 1985) is a Bosnian-Herzegovinian professional basketball player, who plays for KK Gorica of the Croatian League. He was a member of the Bosnia and Herzegovina national basketball team.

Bosnian-Herzegovinian national team
Mašić played for the Bosnia and Herzegovina national basketball team at the FIBA EuroBasket 2013 where he averaged 1.0 points, 1.3 rebounds and 0.0 assists per game.

References

1985 births
Living people
Croats of Bosnia and Herzegovina
Bosnia and Herzegovina men's basketball players
Ikaros B.C. players
KK Cedevita players
KK Cibona players
KK Gorica players
KK Kaštela players
KK Zagreb players
Small forwards